Vanderley Dias Marinho (born 29 December 1987), known as Derley, is a Brazilian professional footballer for Thai League 1 club  Ratchaburi.

Career
Born in São Luís, Maranhão, he began his professional career in Brazil at Ceará and after passing through various clubs in the Brazilian lower leagues.

On 25 June 2013, Derley signed a four-year contract with Portuguese club Marítimo. In Portugal, Derley had his breakthrough season, ending Primeira Liga with 16 goals. In all competitions, he scored 18 goals in 34 appearances. His performances sparked interest from Sporting CP and S.L. Benfica.

On 16 July 2014, Derley signed a four-year contract with Portuguese champions Benfica. On 10 August 2014, he debuted in the 2014 Supercup, winning his first major title. On 5 October, he scored his first goal for Benfica in a 4–0 win against Arouca in the league.

On 20 July 2015, Turkish club Kayserispor announced that Derley had joined them on loan from Benfica, until the end of the season. For the following season, he joined Mexican club Chiapas on a season-long loan with option to buy.

Honours

Club
Benfica
Primeira Liga: 2014–15
Taça da Liga: 2014–15
Supertaça Cândido de Oliveira: 2014

Aves
Taça de Portugal: 2017–18

References

External links
 

 
 
 

1987 births
Living people
People from São Luís, Maranhão
Brazilian footballers
Association football forwards
Esporte Clube Cruzeiro players
S.L. Benfica footballers
Kayserispor footballers
Chiapas F.C. footballers
C.D. Aves players
Estrela Clube Primeiro de Maio players
Primeira Liga players
Süper Lig players
Liga MX players
Thai League 1 players
Muangthong United F.C. players
Ratchaburi Mitr Phol F.C. players
Brazilian expatriate footballers
Expatriate footballers in Portugal
Brazilian expatriate sportspeople in Portugal
Expatriate footballers in Turkey
Brazilian expatriate sportspeople in Turkey
Expatriate footballers in Mexico
Brazilian expatriate sportspeople in Mexico
Expatriate footballers in Thailand
Brazilian expatriate sportspeople in Thailand
Sportspeople from Maranhão